Moseyev Pochinok is a rural locality (a village) in Mardengskoye Rural Settlement, Velikoustyugsky District, Vologda Oblast, Russia. The population was 4 as of 2002.

Geography 
Moseyev Pochinok is located 18 km southwest of Veliky Ustyug (the district's administrative centre) by road. Teltevo is the nearest rural locality.

References 

Rural localities in Velikoustyugsky District